Benimakia is a genus of sea snails, marine gastropod mollusks in the family Fasciolariidae, the spindle snails, the tulip snails and their allies.

Species
Species within the genus Benimakia include:
 Benimakia cloveri Snyder & Vermeij, 2008
 Benimakia delicata Vermeij & Snyder, 2003
 Benimakia fastigium (Reeve, 1847)
 Benimakia flavida (A. Adams, 1855)
 Benimakia lanceolata (Reeve, 1847)
 Benimakia mariei (Crosse, 1869)
 Benimakia mirabilis Bozzetti, 2018
 Benimakia nux Bouchet & Snyder, 2013
 Benimakia rhodostoma (Dunker, 1860) 
 Benimakia rosadoi (Bozzetti, 2002)
 Benimakia rubens (Lamarck, 1822)
 Benimakia rubus Bouchet & Snyder, 2013
 Benimakia sowerbyi (Melvill, 1907)
 Benimakia vermeiji Bouchet & Snyder, 2013
Species brought into synonymy
 Benimakia marquesana (Adams, 1855): synonym of Peristernia marquesana (A. Adams, 1855)
 Benimakia nodata (Gmelin, 1791): synonym of Nodolatirus nodatus (Gmelin, 1791)
 Benimakia ogum (Petuch, 1979): synonym of Pustulatirus ogum (Petuch, 1979)
 Benimakia robillardi (Tapparone-Canefri, 1879): synonym of Nodolatirus robillardi (Tapparone Canefri, 1879)

References

 Habe T. (1958). On the radulae of Japanese marine gastropods (4). Venus. 20(1): 43-60, pls 2-3.
 Bouchet P. & Snyder M.A. (2013) New and old species of Benimakia (Neogastropoda: Fasciolariidae) and a description of Nodolatirus, new genus. Journal of Conchology 41(3): 331-341

Fasciolariidae